Sphenodesme involucrata is a species of small liana in the genus Sphenodesme (family Lamiaceae).  It is found in: India, Assam, Andaman & Nicobar Islands, Myanmar, Vietnam, Thailand, Malaya, Borneo, Guangdong, Hainan, Taiwan and central Vietnam: where it may be called bội tinh tong bao.

Gallery

References

External links

Note: Sphenodesme paniculata C.B.Clarke is a synonym of Sphenodesme involucrata var. paniculata (C.B.Clarke) Munir

Lamiaceae
Flora of Indo-China
Flora of Malesia